This is a list of newspapers in Louisiana.

Daily and weekly newspapers (currently published)

University newspapers
 Louisiana State University – The Daily Reveille
 Louisiana Tech University – The Tech Talk
 McNeese State University – The Contraband
 Tulane University – The Hullabaloo
 University of Louisiana at Lafayette – The Vermilion
 Xavier University of Louisiana – The Xavier Herald
 Southeastern Louisiana University - The Lion’s Roar
 Southern University - The Southern Digest
 Grambling State University - The Gramblinite

Defunct newspapers

See also
 Louisiana media
 List of radio stations in Louisiana
 List of television stations in Louisiana
 Media of locales in Louisiana: Baton Rouge, Lafayette, Monroe, New Orleans, Shreveport, Terrebonne Parish
 :Category:Journalists from Louisiana
 Literature of Louisiana
 List of French-language newspapers published in the United States

References

Bibliography
 
 
 
 
 
 
  (Issue also includes other lists related to Louisiana newspapers)
 
 
 
 
 
  (Includes information about newspapers)

External links

  (List of newspapers)
 
  (Includes information about newspapers)
 
 
  (Directory ceased in 2017)
  
  (Includes Louisiana newspapers)